Prattville–Grouby Field  is a public-use airport located three nautical miles (3.5 mi, 5.6 km) southwest of the central business district of Prattville, a city in Autauga County, Alabama, United States. It is owned by the Prattville Airport Authority. It is also known as Prattville Airport or Autauga County Airport.

This airport is included in the FAA's National Plan of Integrated Airport Systems for 2011–2015, which categorized it as a general aviation facility.

Facilities and aircraft 
It has one runway designated 9/27 with an asphalt surface measuring 5,400 by 100 feet (1,646 x 30 m).

For the 12-month period ending November 1, 2010, the airport had 8,754 aircraft operations, an average of 23 per day: 97% general aviation and 3% military. At that time there were 28 aircraft based at this airport: 86% single-engine and 14% multi-engine.

References

External links 
 Photo of airport terminal
 Aerial image as of 28 February 1998 from USGS The National Map
 
 Official Website:  http://prattvilleairport.com/ 

Airports in Alabama
Transportation buildings and structures in Autauga County, Alabama